Carrion Run is a stream in the U.S. state of West Virginia.

Carrion Run was named for an incident when the decaying bodies of skinned deer were left near the creek.

See also
List of rivers of West Virginia

References

Rivers of Lewis County, West Virginia
Rivers of West Virginia